Third Year at Malory Towers is a children's novel by Enid Blyton set in an English girls' boarding school. It is the third book in the Malory Towers school story series. The novel was first published in 1948.

Plot summary 
Darrell is on the way to Malory Towers once again. Sally Hope, her best friend, is in quarantine for mumps and will be late arriving at the school.

On the way, they collect a new girl, Zerelda Brass, an American girl who has been staying with her English grandmother. Although only fifteen, Zerelda appears older. Her hair is styled in an extravagant adult fashion and she wears makeup and lipstick. Darrell excitedly talks about Malory Towers on the journey and is indignant when she discovers that Zerelda has fallen asleep.

When they arrive at the school, the other girls can hardly believe their eyes at the sight of Zerelda's makeup and startling hair styling. The single exception is Gwendoline, who is overcome with admiration. For the others, the question everyone asks is "Seen Zerelda?" Nobody has ever seen anyone quite like Zerelda. She is placed in North Tower, but in the Fourth Form, one form higher than Darrell and her friends. On her first day the Fourth Form mistress, Miss Williams, initially mistakes her for a new member of the teaching staff. Upon realising that Zerelda is a new girl, Miss Williams orders her to remove her makeup and rearrange her hair.

Mavis, who had arrived at Malory Towers the previous term, has not been a success because of her laziness and selfishness. Her great redeeming feature is strong, deep singing voice, of which she speaks incessantly. Her one topic of conversation is her future career as an opera singer. Jean, the practical and forthright Scottish girl who is now head of the Third Form, has little patience with Mavis, and the other girls regard her as all voice and vanity.

The following day another new girl, Wilhelmina Robinson, arrives. She is on horseback and is accompanied by her seven brothers, also on horseback. Wilhelmina, who has never attended school before, explains that she is always known as Bill and is looking forward to riding her horse Thunder every day, even if it means missing some lessons. Her horse obsession soon leads to disagreements and confrontations with the Third Form mistress, Miss Peters, even though Miss Peters is a keen horsewoman herself. Soon Bill is banned altogether from seeing Thunder in the stables.

Zerelda struggles with the standard of work in the Fourth Form and is moved to the Third Form. She handles the move with dignity, but is inwardly humiliated. As she has aspirations to become a film actress, she consoles herself with a belief that she has outstanding acting ability - but even this belief is crushed when drama teacher Ms Hibbert tells her she is unable to act.

Mavis is excited to discover a talent show in the nearby town of Billington. She imagines herself on stage, hearing thunderous applause. Ignoring the advice of the other girls, she travels to the talent show. But she is not permitted to perform, and after missing the last bus home, spends much of the night outside in a rainstorm. When she is finally found, she is suffering from bronchitis and has lost her voice - possibly irreparably. Zerelda comforts Mavis, drawing on the experience of her acting failure. The two become close friends.

Meanwhile, Bill has been disregarding her ban from the stables. Thunder, her horse, is suffering from colic and Darrell, while searching for Mavis, discovers Bill in the stables tending to him. Darrell enlists the help of Miss Peters, who sets off on horseback to bring back the vet. Thunder recovers and a grateful Bill sees Miss Peters in a new light.

In a thrilling end to the term, Darrell is picked for the school lacrosse team and shoots the winning goal.

Characters

North Tower Third Form girls
Darrell Rivers - the main protagonist of the stories. Has a hot temper
Sally Hope - Darrell's best friend, solid and dependable
Gwendoline Mary Lacey - spoiled, lazy, boastful and conceited
Alicia Johns - lively and quick-witted, always ready with a sharp-tongued opinion.
Jean Dunlop - shrewd Scottish girl, honest and dependable, now Head Girl of the Third Form.
Mary-Lou Linnet - now a little taller, but still timid and "scared looking" The form's "courage mouse".
Wilhelmina (Bill) Robinson - a new girl, obsessed with horses and particularly her own horse, Thunder. Always thinking of Thunder in class and doesn't listen to anything that is said.
Zerelda Brass - a new girl, from America. Looks much older than the other girls, but is the same age.
Irene - a scatterbrained girl who excels at music and mathematics.
Belinda Morris - Irene's best friend and equally scatterbrained friend, a very talented artist.
Mavis - arrived since the last book, a highly talented singer but otherwise lacking in character. Conceited.
Daphne Millicent Turner - pretty, graceful and charming, now much more subdued than when she first arrived. Mary-lou's best friend.

Other girls
Betty Hill - Alicia's friend in West Tower
Molly Ronaldson - school games captain
Lucy - Head Girl of the Fourth Form
Ellen Wilson - arrived as a new girl in the Second Form with Daphne and Belinda, now in the Fourth Form

Mistresses and Staff
Miss Grayling - Headmistress of Malory Towers.
Miss Potts - House Mistress of North Tower and mistress of the First Form.
Miss Peters - Third Form mistress
Miss Williams - Fourth Form mistress
Mam'zelle Dupont - French mistress, described as "short, fat and round," with a jolly temperament
Mam'zelle Rougier - French mistress, described as "thin and sour," with an ill-humoured temperament
Miss Linnie - art mistress
Mr Young - music teacher
Miss Carton - history mistress
Miss Hibbert - English and drama mistress
Miss Donnelly - Sewing mistress
Matron - North Tower Matron, responsible for the well-being of the girls boarding in North Tower

Other characters
Mr Rivers - Darrell's father, a surgeon
Mrs Rivers - Darrell's mother
Felicity Rivers - Darrell's younger sister
Mrs Lacey - Gwendoline's mother
Miss Winter - Gwendoline's former governess
Mr Raglett - farmer
Mr Turnbull - veterinary surgeon

References

External links
 Enid Blyton Society page

1948 British novels
1948 children's books
Methuen Publishing books
Novels by Enid Blyton